Brent Keith Thompson (born January 9, 1971) is a Canadian former professional defenceman who played 121 games in the National Hockey League. He played for the Winnipeg Jets, Phoenix Coyotes, and Los Angeles Kings.

Coaching career
Thompson was formerly the head coach of the Alaska Aces of the ECHL, where he led them to a Kelly Cup Championship in the 2010–11 season. During the 2011–12, Thompson was the head coach for the Bridgeport Sound Tigers of the American Hockey League, affiliate of the New York Islanders of the National Hockey League. In June 2012, the Islanders announced that Thompson would be promoted to assistant coach under Islanders head coach Jack Capuano. To start the 2014-2015 season, Thompson was once again named the head coach for the Bridgeport Sound Tigers of the American Hockey League.

Personal
Thompson is married to Kimberly Oliver, a native of Phoenix, Arizona who he met during his stint with the Phoenix Roadrunners of the International Hockey League. 

The couple have two sons, Tage and Tyce, who are both professional ice hockey players.

Career statistics

Regular season and playoffs

Awards and honours

References

External links

1971 births
Living people
Canadian ice hockey coaches
Canadian ice hockey defencemen
Colorado Eagles players
Hartford Wolf Pack players
Hershey Bears players
Ice hockey player-coaches
Los Angeles Kings draft picks
Los Angeles Kings players
Louisville Panthers players
Medicine Hat Tigers players
New York Islanders coaches
Phoenix Coyotes players
Phoenix Roadrunners (IHL) players
Providence Bruins players
Ice hockey people from Calgary
Springfield Falcons players
Winnipeg Jets (1979–1996) players